Victory (stylized in capital letters) is the eleventh live album by California-based worship collective Bethel Music, and their sixteenth full-length release overall. The album was released on through the collective's imprint label, Bethel Music, on January 25, 2019. The album is inspired by the biblical account of King Jehoshaphat's victory over the Moabite alliance in war by sending out a group of worshipers as a vanguard for his army. The featured worship leaders on the album are Josh Baldwin, Cory Asbury, Jonathan David & Melissa Helser, Bethany Wohrle, Sean Feucht, Emmy Rose, Brian Johnson, Jenn Johnson, Kalley Heiligenthal, Paul McClure, Hannah McClure and Hunter G K Thompson  with Molly Skaggs, Daniel Bashta and Harvest as guests. Ed Cash handled the production of the album.

The album was preceded by the release of "Stand in Your Love" as a single on August 10, 2018. Following the album's release, "Raise a Hallelujah" became the second single with its release on March 8, 2019. To promote the album, the collective is embarking on the Victory Tour, which began on February 4, 2019, at The Fillmore in Miami, Florida, and is set to conclude on October 16, 2019, at the Ovens Auditorium in Charlotte, North Carolina. "Goodness of God" became the third single from the album on November 1, 2019.

Garnering critical acclaim for its production and the variety of musical genres, the album also became a commercial success with debuts on mainstream charts in the United States, Australia, Canada, the Netherlands, Scotland and Switzerland, with the album concurrently appearing at No. 2 and No. 1 on the American and British Christian charts respectively.

Background
Victory marks Bethel Music first collection of new songs in two years, that is, since the release of Starlight in April 2017. The album was written, recorded and produced in 2018, which proved to be an tumultuous year for the Bethel Church community, as Jaxon Taylor (son of Bethel Music CEO Joel Taylor) was in a life-threatening health situation having contracted Hemolytic-uremic syndrome, and the near-month-long devastating Carr Fire, a wildfire which had made its way to Redding.

The album was inspired by the biblical account of King Jehoshaphat's war with the Moabite alliance, recorded in 2 Chronicles 20:1-30. The alliance, which consisted of the kingdoms of Moab, Ammon and some of the Meunites), waged war against the Kingdom of Judah, which was under Jehoshaphat's reign. Jehoshaphat decided to inquire from God and proclaimed a fast in his kingdom and reassurance from Jahaziel, who delivered a prophetic word that God would fight their battles. Having consulted some people, Jehoshaphat appointed men to go, praising God, at the head of the army, and God delivered the victory to Judah.

Music and lyrics
The album, like previous Bethel Music releases, is primarily a contemporary worship album, which contains various genres such acoustic, Americana, country, and folk music. The sound on the album has drawn comparisons to Rend Collective, especially on songs such as "Drenched in Love", "Stand in Your Love", and "There Is a Name". Lyrically, the album explores the theme of triumph and faithfulness.

Artwork
Stephen James Hart, the art director and visual worship leader for Bethel Music, shared on his blog the story of the album artwork for Victory. The artwork is a literal representation of the stories of the songs on the album being captured in the "ideal newspaper"; each issue detailing the stories of God and his goodness through the stories, testimonies, lyrics and photos.

Release and promotion
On December 10, 2018, Hallels reported that Bethel Music would be releasing Victory on January 25, 2019. On January 4, 2019, Bethel Music commenced the album pre-order for Victory, availing "Raise a Hallelujah", "Goodness of God", "Ain't No Grave" and "Victory Is Yours" as promotional singles that were available for digital download and streaming. Bethel Music then released the live music videos of the songs in their respective order, recorded at Bethel Church, on the four days that followed the pre-order, releasing each song per day. The complete album was released on January 25, 2019.

Singles
Fox News first reported in an article that "Stand in Your Love" will be released by Josh Baldwin in July 2018. On 19 July 2018, Bethel Music then released the live music video of the song, recorded Heaven Come Conference 2018, on YouTube. Bethel Music then released a studio rendition of "Stand in Your Love" on August 10, 2018.

On March 8, 2019, "Raise a Hallelujah" was released as the album's second single.

On November 1, 2019, "Goodness of God" was released digitally as the album's third single.

Tour
In October 2018, Bethel Music announced on Twitter that they would be headlining the Victory Tour in 2019, with three tour legs in February, April and October. It was later revealed that Tasha Cobbs Leonard and Housefires would also be joining the collective on the Victory Tour. The tour began on February 4, 2019, with a sold-out show at The Fillmore in Miami, Florida, less than two weeks after the album was released. Bethel Music indicated on the tour's webpage that Phil Wickham will join the October leg of the tour. The tour set to end on October 16, 2019, at the Ovens Auditorium in Charlotte, North Carolina.

Reception

Critical response

Victory was critically acclaimed upon its release, notably for the diversity in style, lyrical content and production. James Christopher Monger of AllMusic described the album as "a galvanizing set of songs," and that it features "stirring pieces." Jonathan Andre opined in his 365 Days of  Inspiring Media review that Bethel  Music "are a force in the worship music industry to be reckoned with, and Victory continues with that assertion." CCM Magazine's Andrew Greenlagh said that Victory was "worship music at its finest" and that it is one of Bethel's strongest releases to date. Jono Davies, reviewing for Louder Than the Music, also echoed the sentiment that Victory is a strong album. In a positive review for Eden.co.uk, Laura White noted that the album is "hope-filled and faith-empowering but it’s authentic praise."

Rating the album nine out of ten squares for in a positive review for Cross Rhythms, Tony Cummings said the commented that "Like King Jehosophat, they have seized a victory by sending worshippers to the frontline of battle." Timothy Yap, bestowing the album a four-out-of-five score in a Hallels Review, complimented that the sound is "impeccable," but complained that the songs "can also be a tad formulaic." In a favorable review by Luchae William of Gateway News, having "thoroughly enjoyed" the album, commended its musical production, and said it was "one of the better Bethel worship releases that has crossed my desk in a while." Jasmin Patterson praised the album in a NewReleaseToday review, concluding that "is a collection of songs that will bring you into an encounter with God, empower you to sing His promises over your circumstances, and give you a variety of musical styles to enjoy while you do it."

Accolades

Commercial performance
In the United States, Victory launched at No. 2 on the U.S. Billboard Christian Albums chart dated February 9, 2019.
The album was also landed at No. 2 on the Independent Albums chart, registered as the fourth best-selling digital album, and debuted on the mainstream Billboard 200 chart at No. 56 that same week, as well as the Canadian Albums Chart at No. 77.

Victory charted at No. 23 on the ARIA Top 100 Albums Chart in Australia. The album also launched in the Netherlands on the Album Top 100 at No. 162. In the United Kingdom, it launched at No. 1 on the Official Christian & Gospel Albums Chart published by the Official Charts Company, while registering on the Official Scottish Albums at No. 41. In Switzerland, Victory made its debut at No. 19 on the Swiss Hitparade Albums Chart.

Track listing

Sample credits
 "Ain't No Grave" contains an interpolation of the song, "Ain't No Grave" written by Claude Ely.
 "Drenched in Love" contains an interpolation of the traditional hymn, "Nothing But the Blood".

Personnel
Adapted from AllMusic.

 Eric Allen – artist direction, director
 Jacob Arnold – drums
 Cory Asbury – vocals
 Josh Baldwin – vocals
 Daniel Bashta – vocals
 Andrew Bergthold – background vocals, keyboards, pre-production, programming
 Jordan Borgart – creative director
 Kyle Briskin – background vocals
 Robby Busick – production manager
 Ed Cash – acoustic guitar, background vocals, electric guitar, keyboards, mandolin, mixing, producer, programming
 Franni Cash – background vocals
 Martin Cash – background vocals, drum programming, percussion
 Scott Cash – acoustic guitar, background vocals, electric guitar
 Chris Estes – director
 Alton Eugene – choir/chorus
 Sean Feucht – vocals
 Samantha Fischer – choir/chorus
 John-Paul Gentile – baritone, drum programming, hammer dulcimer, hi string guitar, percussion
 Maria Githuku – choir/chorus
 Rachel Soh – photography
 Jordana Griffith – photography
 Stephen James Hart – art direction and design
 Kalley Heiligenthal – vocals
 Jonathan David Helser – vocals
 Melissa Helser – vocals
 Luke Hendrickson – keyboards, programming
 David Hislop – electric guitar
 Jenny Hislop – production manager
 Ryan Huntington – editing
 Brian Johnson – executive producer, vocals
 Jenn Johnson – executive producer, vocals
 Joe LaPorta – mastering
 Jonathan Lee – electric guitar
 Ebonee Marrow – choir/chorus
 Hannah McClure – vocals
 Paul McClure – vocals
 Mat Ogden – bass guitar
 Michael Pope – electric guitar
 Edward Rivera – choir/chorus
 Emmy Rose – vocals
 Justin Schipper – steel guitar
 Molly Skaggs – vocals
 Rachel Soh – photography
 Nick Stailey – keyboards, programming
 Kelcey Swanstrum – choir/chorus
 Joel Taylor – executive producer
 Hunter Thompson – vocals
 David Whitworth – drums
 Bethany Wohrle – vocals

Charts

Weekly charts

Year-end charts

Release history

References

External links
 
  on PraiseCharts

2019 live albums
Bethel Music albums